Maynard's Green is a village in the Wealden district of East Sussex.

External links
 Maynards Green Community Primary School

Wealden District
East Sussex